Kathleen Flinn (born June 1, 1967) is an American writer, journalist and chef.  She is best known for the 2007 New York Times bestseller, The Sharper Your Knife, the Less You Cry.

Early life
Flinn was born in Davison, Michigan, to Milton G. Flinn Sr., a foreman for General Motors' AC Spark Plug plant in Flint. Her mother was also employed by GM in its personnel department. She was the youngest of five siblings. All were significantly older, so by the time she entered elementary school, she was the only child living at home. Flinn states she began cooking at age eight to feed herself as a latchkey kid, and began writing stories around the same time. At the age of 11, she and her parents abruptly moved to Anna Maria Island in Florida due her father's terminal cancer diagnosis; he died two years later. Her third book focuses on these early years in her life. Before she graduated from Manatee High School, she decided she didn't want to go to college in Florida. She said she threw a dart at a map and it landed landed on Gary, Indiana, so she packed up her car and move to Chicago, the closest major city. She was 18 and had never been there.

Books
Flinn's debut book, The Sharper Your Knife, the Less You Cry was the first to provide an in-depth look of attending and graduating from the famed Paris culinary school Le Cordon Bleu.  The book has been translated into several languages and sold in more than 60 countries worldwide.

After losing her job due to a management reorganization, 36-year-old Flinn decided to cash in her savings to attend the famed culinary school, graduating with a diplome de cuisine in 2005. Throughout the book, Flinn intersperses dozens of recipes, accounts of her "wretchedly inadequate" French, stories of competitive classmates and the love story of her emerging relationship with her husband. Early in the book, she shares that she began dreaming of attending the famous cooking school while writing obituaries at The Sarasota Herald-Tribune. The Seattle Times referred to the book "a very personal memoir of transformation, as well as an insider's look at Le Cordon Bleu, the first of its kind." The book earned generally positive reviews on its debut and earned a spot on The New York Times bestseller list as well as being included on numerous "best of" lists for 2007 before being named a finalist for the Washington State Book Award in General Non-fiction in 2008. The film rights to the work were purchased by a division of 20th Century Fox.

Her second book, The Kitchen Counter Cooking School (Viking/Penguin, October 2011) chronicles a year-long project inspired by a supermarket encounter with a woman loading up on processed foods. Flinn used her culinary training to help novice cooks find their cooking confidence and in the process, reported on the state of home cooking in general. The book earned a 2012 ASJA Award for Best Book in the Non-Fiction Autobiography/Memoir category from the American Society of Journalists and Authors

Viking/Penguin published her third book, Burnt Toast Makes You Sing Good, a multi-generational culinary memoir about growing up in her home state of Michigan. The title refers to her grandmother's phrase meant to coax the youngest kids to eat burnt toast. Flinn reflected it had a metaphorical meaning, "that going through something tough is good for you, or what doesn't kill you makes you stronger." That book was a finalist in several book awards, including Goodreads Readers Choice Awards and the International Association of Culinary Professionals, and was named a Michigan Notable Book.

Outside of her book publishing career, Flinn's work has been featured in more than three dozen publications worldwide.

Popularity in Japan

In 2017, Flinn's second book, The Kitchen Counter Cooking School, was translated into Japanese under the title Dameonnatachi no Jinsei wo Kaeta Kiseki no Ryouri Kyoushitsu which loosely translates to Magical Recipes for Bad Women. The book was a bestseller, and among the few translated works that reached the top 30 in sales on Amazon.jp that year. In 2018, Flinn announced that she was working on a new book specifically for the Japanese market. The resulting book, Sakana Lesson, debuted in June 2019 from CCC Media House.

Other notable work

While earning a B.A. in journalism at Columbia College Chicago, she held internships at Adweek and Playboy magazines and worked as a stringer for the Chicago Sun-Times before launching on a journalism career that included newspapers and magazines. Notably, she was founding editor-in-chief of Internet Underground,, a print magazine about the internet launched in 1994 which later developed a cult following. She was recruited by Microsoft as one of a handful of writers to develop the prototype of what would become Sidewalk.com, the company's network of online city guides In 2000, while working as a lead in the editorial operations for the company's MSN operation in London, she was among a small team that pulled together Madonna's "come back" concert at the Brixton Academy; with 11 million viewers, the event was listed in the Guinness Book of World Records as the largest live webcast for several years.

Personal
Flinn is married to Michael Klozar, a Microsoft former colleague turned entrepreneur; their courtship is part of the story in The Sharper Your Knife. They have divided their time between residences in Seattle and Anna Maria Island, Florida, since 2004, after they married at the home once owned by Fred Hutchinson on Beach Avenue.

Books

, New York Times bestseller
, winner, 2012 Book Award, American Society of Journalists & Authors

References

External links
Kathleen Flinn's web site
Le Cordon Bleu's web site

1967 births
Living people
Alumni of Le Cordon Bleu
American food writers
People from Davison, Michigan
Writers from Seattle